Rhopalum coarctatum  is a Palearctic species of solitary wasp.

References

External links
Images representing Rhopalum coarctatum 

Hymenoptera of Europe
Crabronidae
Insects described in 1763
Taxa named by Giovanni Antonio Scopoli